Crazy Nights is the third studio album by British heavy metal band Tygers of Pan Tang, released in November 1981 on MCA and is rumoured to be the last album to be recorded at Trident Studios before it closed the same year.

Cover art
The album cover features a giant tiger on top of London's Post Office Tower spoofing the climactic scene in the movie King Kong.

Track listing
All songs written by Tygers of Pan Tang

Personnel
Tygers of Pan Tang
Jon Deverill - vocals
Robb Weir - guitar
John Sykes - guitar
Richard "Rocky" Laws - bass guitar
Brian Dick - drums

Production
Dennis MacKay - producer, engineer
Rodney Matthews - cover painting

Charts

References

1981 albums
Tygers of Pan Tang albums
Albums with cover art by Rodney Matthews
Albums recorded at Trident Studios